Austronecydalopsis iridipennis is a species of beetle in the family Cerambycidae. It was described by Fairmaire and Germain in 1864.

References

Necydalopsini
Beetles described in 1864